Scott Berry (born December 23, 1948 in Deadwood, South Dakota) is an American former ski jumper who competed in the 1972 Winter Olympics.

References

1948 births
Living people
American male ski jumpers
People from Deadwood, South Dakota
Olympic ski jumpers of the United States
Ski jumpers at the 1972 Winter Olympics